John Brandt (March 18, 1883 – March 19, 1950) was an American golfer. He competed in the men's individual event at the 1904 Summer Olympics.

References

External links
 

1883 births
1950 deaths
Amateur golfers
American male golfers
Golfers at the 1904 Summer Olympics
Olympic golfers of the United States
Golfers from St. Louis